Terry Sanford High School (formerly known as Fayetteville Senior High School) is a public high school in Fayetteville, North Carolina. It is named after Terry Sanford, who was a North Carolina state senator, Governor of North Carolina, and United States Senator. Students range from grades 9–12 and is a part of the Cumberland County School System.

History

The origins of Terry Sanford High School stem from when Clyde R. Hoey, then Governor of North Carolina, dedicated Fayetteville Senior High School on September 23, 1940. In October 1954, the high school moved locations, and the student body moved to a different facility. Fayetteville High School was renamed "Terry Sanford High School" in 1968.

Demographics
The demographic breakdown of the 1,307 students enrolled for the 2012–2013 school year was:
Male50.9%
Female49.1%
Native American/Alaskan1.1%
Asian/Pacific islander5.3%
Black39.9%
Hispanic9.8%
White36.3%
Multiracial7.6%

52.9% of the students qualified for free or reduced-cost lunch. In 2015–2016, Terry Sanford was a school-wide Title I school.

Athletics
Terry Sanford's sports teams play under the name "Bulldogs". The school has 17 varsity teams which compete in the Cape Fear Valley Conference.

Notable alumni 

Dwayne Allen, NFL tight end
Chip Beck, professional golfer who played on the PGA Tour
Greg Campbell, journalist and nonfiction author
J. Cole, Grammy Award-winning rapper and producer
Mark Gilbert, NFL cornerback for the Detroit Lions
Karly Gustafson, former member of the Puerto Rico women's national soccer team
Jimmy Herring, lead guitarist of Widespread Panic
Gene Hobbs, founding board member of non-profit Rubicon Foundation
Chris Hondros, was a Pulitzer Prize-nominated war photographer
Brad Miller, politician
Tim Morrison, NFL cornerback
Shea Ralph, current University of Connecticut women's basketball assistant coach*Antwoine Sanders, NFL safety
Brent Sexton, NFL defensive back
Holden Thorp, former Chancellor of University of North Carolina at Chapel Hill, former provost at Washington University in St. Louis
Malik Turner, rapper and producer
Oli Udoh, NFL offensive tackle
Josh Villalobos, former soccer player on the Puerto Rico national team
Demetria Washington, track and field athlete

See also
 Terry Sanford

References

External links 
 

Schools in Cumberland County, North Carolina
Public high schools in North Carolina
Education in Fayetteville, North Carolina